John D Wood & Co. is a UK Estate agent, established in London in 1872.

History
John Daniel Wood founded his eponymous company opposite the Connaught Hotel in Mount Street, London, in 1872, at the age of 23.  After the First World War the company regularly took instructions on great London houses and country estates, including the sale of Dorchester House, Park Lane (now the Dorchester Hotel), Leeds Castle in Kent and Parham Park in Sussex. In 1930 the company moved headquarters to Berkeley Square where the firm's headquarters remained until the late 1980s.

In 1982 the commercial and residential arms of John D Wood separated to form John D Wood & Co. (Residential and Agricultural) and John D Wood (Commercial).  In 1987 the Residential and Agricultural arm floated on the London Stock Exchange, and in 1997, when its growth proved attractive to investors, the listed company was acquired by Hambro Countrywide plc. In 1998, Hambros de-merged the newly created Countrywide Assured Group plc which became the UK's largest estate agency group until March 2021, when John D Wood & Co's parent company, Countrywide, was acquired by Connells Group, making Connells the UK's largest estate agency group.

Operations
John D Wood & Co. has twenty-one London offices, six country offices and associated offices throughout the south of England.

Services
Investment, Sales, Acquisitions & Leasing
Research & Consultancy
Surveying & Legal Valuations
Freehold / Leasehold Acquisition & Collective Enfranchisement
Residential, Commercial & Industrial Services
Property Management

See also
 John D Wood

References

External links
Official website

Property services companies of the United Kingdom
Real estate companies established in 1872
British companies established in 1872
1872 establishments in England